I Am a Hotel is a 1983 Canadian made for TV short musical film, written by Leonard Cohen and Mark Shekter and directed by Allan F. Nicholls.

The storyline is based on imaginary events in the King Edward Hotel in Toronto, and the guests' (usually romantic) interactions with each other.

Production
Leonard Cohen had the idea for the film based upon his personal experiences and his song "The Guests".  It was originally intended for the Canadian pay TV network C-Channel, but when the network collapsed, the production was completed by Citytv with financial assistance from Canadian Broadcasting Corporation (CBC) and the Canadian Film Development Corporation.

Scenes
Cohen features frequently, as an amused bystander ('the Resident'). Extensive dance routines in scenes 2 and 3 were choreographed by Ann(e) Ditchburn, who also dances as the Gypsy wife in scene 3.
There are five scenes, each based on a Cohen song.
"The Guests" in which the characters enter via the lobby and are taken to their rooms; The bellboy and chambermaid meet in the corridor; and the manager and his wife apparently have angry words in the lobby after which she strides off.
"Memories" (in which the bellboy pursues the chambermaid around the laundry and ballroom)
"The Gypsy Wife" (in which the manager's wife, in fetching attire, dances on the boardroom table)
"Chelsea Hotel #2" (in which the two lovers try, and fail, to make love, and the admiral and diva at last face each other across the hallway)
"Suzanne" (in which scenes of Suzanne with Cohen are interspersed with shots of the two couples reunited  and dancing together, and the hotel manager distraught and then drinking at the bar)

A short epilogue repeats the opening material from 'The Guests'. The final credits give the makers as 'Blue Memorial Video Ltd' and dedicate the piece to David Blue (1941-1982).

Cast
Leonard Cohen as The Resident
Celia Franca as The Diva
Alberta Watson as Suzanne
Toller Cranston as The Manager
Claudia Moore as Chambermaid
Daniel Allman as Young Lover
Samantha Logan as Young Lover
Robert Desrosiers as The Bellboy
Anne Ditchburn as The Gypsy Wife
Leo Leyden as The Admiral

Release
The film was released on video in 1996.

Recognition
The film won a Golden Rose international television award at the 1984 Montreux TV festival in Montreux, Switzerland.

References

Further reading

External links
I Am a Hotel at the Internet Movie Database
I Am a Hotel at the Leonard Cohen files

1983 films
Films shot in Toronto
Films set in Toronto
Canadian drama short films
Leonard Cohen
1980s musical films
Canadian musical films
1980s English-language films
1980s Canadian films